opened in Matsusaka, Mie Prefecture, Japan in 1994. It is dedicated to the life and work of local scion and explorer Matsuura Takeshirō, who travelled to Ezo six times at the end of the Edo period, penning many volumes of diaries and producing many maps. The collection includes the Important Cultural Property Materials Relating to Matsuura Takeshirō, an assemblage of some 1,503 items.

See also
 List of Cultural Properties of Japan - historical materials (Mie)
 Ainu people
 Motoori Norinaga

References

External links

 Matsuura Takeshirō Memorial Museum

Matsusaka, Mie
Museums in Mie Prefecture
Museums established in 1994
1994 establishments in Japan
Biographical museums in Japan